David Fulton (born 8 May 1983) is a New Zealand cricketer. He played in two first-class matches for Canterbury in 2013.

See also
 List of Canterbury representative cricketers

References

External links
 

1983 births
Living people
New Zealand cricketers
Canterbury cricketers
Cricketers from Christchurch